Carlos Humberto  "Pity" Camacho (born June 9, 1971) is a Colombian actor, best known for his participation in numerous telenovelas.  He has acted in many telenovelas in his native Colombia, where he started his acting career. His most recent credits include Telemundo's new version of La Viuda de Blanco, and in 2007 he acts in Pecados Ajenos, also a Telemundo produced serial.

Telenovelas

References

External links
https://web.archive.org/web/20101213224019/http://colombialink.com/01_INDEX/index_personajes/actuacion/camacho_carlos.html

1971 births
Living people
Colombian male film actors
Colombian male telenovela actors